Catacombs Mountain is a  mountain summit located in the Athabasca River valley of Jasper National Park, in the Canadian Rockies of Alberta, Canada.

Catacombs Mountain was named by Arthur O. Wheeler in 1921 on account of an alcove formation which resembles the recesses in catacombs.

Climate

Based on the Köppen climate classification, Catacombs Mountain is located in a subarctic climate with cold, snowy winters, and mild summers.

Geology

Catacombs Mountain is composed of sedimentary rock laid down from the Precambrian to Jurassic periods. Formed in shallow seas, this sedimentary rock was pushed east and over the top of younger rock during the Laramide orogeny.

See also
List of mountains of Canada
Geology of the Rocky Mountains

References

External links
 Parks Canada web site: Jasper National Park
 Catacombs Mountain photo: Catacombs Mountain Flickr

Three-thousanders of Alberta
Alberta's Rockies